The Volga Boatman is a 1926 American silent drama film directed by Cecil B. DeMille, who reportedly said the film was, "his greatest achievement in picture making". The film's budget was $479,000 and grossed $1.27 million. The film was highly successful, turning William Boyd into matinee idol overnight. The filming location was Wood Island, near Rio Vista, California in 1925.

Cast
 William Boyd as Feodor, a Volga boatman
 Elinor Fair as Vera, a princess
 Robert Edeson as Prince Nikita
 Victor Varconi as Prince Dimitri
 Julia Faye as Mariusha, a gypsy
 Theodore Kosloff as Stefan, a blacksmith
 Arthur Rankin as Vashi, a Boatman
 Ed Brady as A Boatman (uncredited)
 Charles Clary as Red Army officer (uncredited)
 Gino Corrado as White Army officer (uncredited)
 Lillian Elliott as landlady (uncredited)
 John George as Red Army soldier (uncredited)

Home media
On June 27, 2000, the film was released on VHS by Kino Video. In July 2014, The Video Cellar released a lightly tinted DVD version of the film, and is currently the most widely available version. However, this version does not contain a musical score.

External links 

allmovie/synopsis
The Volga Boatman at SilentEra.com
The Volga Boatman DVD issue
The Volga Boatman (1926) A Silent Film Review | Movies Silently

Films directed by Cecil B. DeMille
1926 films
American silent feature films
American black-and-white films
American romantic drama films
1926 romantic drama films
Films set in Russia
Russian Revolution films
Producers Distributing Corporation films
1920s American films
Silent romantic drama films
Silent American drama films